The Oklahoma Defenders were a professional indoor football team and a charter member of the Champions Professional Indoor Football League (CPIFL). Based in Tulsa, Oklahoma, the Defenders played their home games at the Cox Business Center.

It was announced in August 2014, that the team would go dark and cease all operation for the 2015 season, with the goal to return in the 2016 season. Many expect the team to fold and not return for the 2016 season.

The Defenders are the second arena/indoor team based in Tulsa, following the Tulsa Talons which played in arenafootball2 from the league's inaugural season in 2000 until its final season of 2009, and later in the Arena Football League from 2010 until 2011, after which the Talons moved to San Antonio.

History
The Defenders began play in 2012 as a member of the American Professional Football League.  The Defenders experienced immediate success, finishing the regular season with a 9–3 record, tied for second place with the Council Bluffs Express. However, the Defenders would get the #3 seed because of the Express holding the head-to-head tiebreaker.  In the teams' first-round playoff game, the Defenders lost to the Express 37–32.

For the 2013 season, the Defenders played in the Champions Professional Indoor Football League. They posted a 3–9 record in their inaugural season in the CPIFL.  The team's sophomore season in 2014 in the CPIFL was not much better with a duplicate 3–9 record.

It was announced in August 2014, that the team would go dark and cease all operation for the 2015 season, with the goal to return in the 2016 season.

Final roster

Season-by-season

|-
| colspan="6" align="center" | Oklahoma Defenders (APFL)
|-
| 2012 || 9 || 3 || 0 || 3rd League || Lost Semi-final (Council Bluffs)
|-
| colspan="6" align="center" | Oklahoma Defenders (CPIFL)
|-
| 2013 || 3 || 9 || 0 || 8th League || -- 
|-
| 2014 || 4 || 8 || 0 || 7th League || --
|-
!Totals || 16 || 20 || 0
|colspan="2"| (including playoffs)

2014

Season schedule

Past seasons

2013

Season schedule

2012

Season schedule

Source:

References

External links
Oklahoma Defenders official website

American football teams in Oklahoma
Champions Professional Indoor Football League teams
Defunct American football teams in Oklahoma
Sports in Tulsa, Oklahoma
American football teams established in 2012
American football teams disestablished in 2014
2012 establishments in Oklahoma
2014 disestablishments in Oklahoma